Charles F. Kennel (born August 20, 1939) is an American plasma physicist and former Associate Administrator of NASA.  He is an elected member of the National Academy of Sciences and won the James Clerk Maxwell Prize for Plasma Physics in 1997. In 2009, he was advertised by NASA Watch as a potential pick by Barack Obama as the next NASA Administrator.

Early life and career
Kennel received a bachelor's degree in astronomy from Harvard College and a doctorate in astrophysical sciences from Princeton University. His doctoral thesis was advised by Edward A. Frieman.

Charles Kennel was a former Associate Administrator of NASA. He was the director of Mission to Planet Earth, a program during the Clinton Administration to perform a comprehensive survey and observation of our home planet. He was a member and chair of the NASA Advisory Council (NAC) Science Committee which he quit in 2006.

Ninth Director of Scripps Institution of Oceanography
Vice Chancellor of Marine Sciences at the University of California, San Diego, from 1998 to 2006.
Member and chair of the NASA Advisory Council  (1998–2006)
Chair of the National Academy of Science's Space Studies Board
In May 2009, Kennel was named a member of the Review of United States Human Space Flight Plans Committee an independent review requested by the Office of Science and Technology Policy (OSTP) on May 7, 2009.
In January 2014, Kennel was elected the inaugural Visiting Research Fellow at the Centre for Science and Policy (CSaP), University of Cambridge.

Honors and awards
Kennel was awarded the Guggenheim Fellowship in 1987 and was inducted into the National Academy of Sciences in 1991. He was elected to the American Philosophical Society in 2003. In 1997, he received the James Clerk Maxwell Prize for Plasma Physics from the American Physical Society.

Works

 Unstable growth of unducted whistlers propagating at an angle to the geomagnetic field – 1966 – Trieste : International Atomic Energy Agency, International Centre for Theoretical Physics
 What we have learned from the magnetosphere – 1974 – Los Angeles, Calif. : Plasma Physics Group, University of California, Los Angeles
 Matter in motion : the spirit and evolution of physics – 1977 – Charles F. Kennel and Ernest S. Abers – Boston : Allyn and Bacon
 Convection And Substorms: Paradigms Of Magnetospheric Phenomenology – 1996 – Oxford University Press, Usa – 
The Climate Threat We Can Beat, in May/June 2012 Foreign Affairs with David G. Victor, Veerabhadran Ramanathan, and Kennel (website is paid while article is current)

References

External links
Biography from APS
Biography from NASA

 

1939 births
Living people
Members of the United States National Academy of Sciences
Harvard University alumni
Princeton University alumni
University of California, San Diego faculty
American plasma physicists
Fellows of the American Physical Society
Members of the American Philosophical Society